Police Quest: Open Season (also known as Police Quest IV) is a 1993 police procedural point-and-click adventure video game developed and published by Sierra On-Line. It is the fourth installment in the Police Quest series. Departing from the setting of the first three installments, Open Season follows police detective John Carey as he investigates a series of brutal murders in Los Angeles.

The game was produced in cooperation with former Los Angeles Police Department (LAPD) chief Daryl F. Gates, replacing former California Highway Patrol officer Jim Walls, who left Sierra around 1991.

Open Season was well-received by critics, but underperformed compared to previous entries. An updated CD version was released in 1996. An indirect sequel and spinoff, Police Quest: SWAT, was released in 1995.

Gameplay
Open Season uses point-and-click gameplay. Icons for "walking", "speaking, "using", and "looking" are used rather than the text-parsing system used in the first two games. The mouse is used to select and interact with objects from the game world and the player's inventory, as well as to direct the player character around the various environments.

Like previous Police Quest games, Open Season places emphasis on following proper police procedure, with penalties for failing to do so. These extend from actions to how the player treats certain characters; for example, the player choosing to harass female characters will eventually lead to a game over.

Most of the game uses full-motion video, with most characters being video recordings of actors and most background being edited photographs of real locations in Los Angeles, such as the interior of the Parker Center. Written text is replaced by audible narration and dialogue in the 1996 CD version.

Plot
In Los Angeles, LAPD Robbery-Homicide detective John Carey is dispatched to investigate a homicide in a South Central alley. There, Carey finds his best friend and ex-partner Bob Hickman dead, alongside an eight-year-old boy. The seemingly random string of gang-related murders continues along, which Carey continues to investigate. Five more people are murdered, mutilated, and found in public places, as Carey attempts to pursue the serial killer.

In his investigation, Carey questions the owner of a second-rate movie theater, who offers him tea and invites him into the theatre to watch a film. Carey passes out and hallucinates the theater owner as a cross-dresser at the Hickman homicide scene, before being woken up and thrown out. Carey finds the killer's house (led there by his dog), and finds a severed head in a fridge alongside a hidden passage that leads back to the theater. Investigating, Carey finds a woman passed out in the seats, and sees the theater owner dragging her into a back room, before being knocked unconscious. Waking up, Carey confirms the theater owner is the killer and scavenges hair spray and a lighter to arm himself with a makeshift flamethrower. Searching the theater, Carey finds the theater owner preparing to kill the woman and torches him with the flamethrower, killing him and saving the woman. For his efforts, the Mayor of Los Angeles presents Carey with the LAPD Medal of Valor.

Development
Open Season was the first entry in the Police Quest series to be developed without former series designer Jim Walls, who left Sierra due to "circumstances". The game was developed in Sierra's SCI engine.

Sierra had three box designs in consideration for the game: A bloody hand reaching for the title, a file folder, and the Los Angeles city skyline. The company had a focus group vote on them, and the file folder design garnered almost no votes, with the other two covers splitting the majority. The final decision was reached because parents in the focus group often had a negative side comment about the bloody hand design, so the city skyline cover eventually won. The game was released in November 1993.

The 1996 CD release of the game included audio dialogue, a two-minute promotional video, and copies of official LAPD documents.

Reception
The first four Police Quest games totaled 850,000 sales by late 1995. However, Markus Krichel of PC Games noted that "interest on the part of the gamer fell slightly" with Open Season, which led Sierra On-Line to experiment with a new direction for the series with Police Quest: SWAT. According to Sierra, combined sales of the Police Quest series—including SWAT—surpassed 1.2 million units by the end of March 1996.

Computer Gaming World stated in February 1994 that "Police Quest: Open Season evinces a remarkable degree of work-a-day police realism as a result of Gates' contributions", with "marvelous digitized backgrounds". A longer review in March 1994 stated that the game had succeeded "at so many levels", that its realism and "seemingly endless amounts of" police procedure offered "larger implications about our society and its struggle against the drug machine". The reviewer noted that treating NPCs with the same "lack of consideration" players do so in other games "seems incredibly damning—and heartrending—because it's true to life. We treat each other, the game implies, in our attempts merely to cope with the problems with which we are faced, like NPCs". The magazine concluded that "Open Season tells that story magnificently".

Next Generation reviewed the Macintosh version of the game, rating it two stars out of five, and stated that "the ultimate Sierra police-based game is still a fond dream to look forward to; and in the meantime we can still keep ourselves amused with the Leisure Suit Larry series."

Controversy 
Open Season was met with some controversy over its portrayal of minorities. In the game, most African Americans use exaggerated African-American Vernacular English (e.g. a witness introducing himself as "I be Raymond Jones the third"), and numerous businesses are owned by immigrants who also speak in stereotypical accents (e.g. a convenience store owned by a Chinese American who speaks Engrish).

Although credited as the game's author, Daryl Gates did not write the game's storyline and denounced the depictions, insisting they were not his idea. Gates claimed that the story had been penned by Sierra writer Tammy Dargan, a former segment producer for America's Most Wanted; Dargan said the African American dialogue was based on Fab Five Freddy's rap dictionary Fresh Fly Flavor.

See also 

 Blue Force

References

External links

1993 video games
African-American-related controversies
Adventure games
Classic Mac OS games
DOS games
Fiction about murder
Fictional portrayals of the Los Angeles Police Department
Games commercially released with DOSBox
LGBT-related video games
Police Quest and SWAT
Point-and-click adventure games
Race-related controversies in video games
ScummVM-supported games
Single-player video games
Sierra Entertainment games
Video game controversies
Video games about dreams
Video games about police officers
Video games with digitized sprites
Video games set in 1993
Video games set in the United States
Video games set in California
Video games set in Los Angeles
Windows games
Video games developed in the United States